Benjamin Franklin Dyer (February 13, 1893 – August 7, 1959) was a Major League Baseball infielder. He played all or part of six seasons in the majors, from  until , for the New York Giants and Detroit Tigers. Dyer played seven different positions in all, but he appeared primarily as a third baseman or shortstop.

External links 

Major League Baseball infielders
New York Giants (NL) players
Detroit Tigers players
Decatur Commodores players
Denver Bears players
Toledo Mud Hens players
1893 births
1959 deaths
Baseball players from Chicago
Burials in Wisconsin